Yangiqoʻrgʻon is a district of Namangan Region in Uzbekistan. The capital is in the town Yangiqoʻrgʻon. Its area is 525 km2. Its population is 221,800 (2021 est.).

The district consists of 19 urban-type settlements (Yangiqoʻrgʻon, Bekobod, Gʻovazon, Zarkent, Iskavot, Kalishoh, Qizil qiyoq, Qorayantoq, Qorapolvon, Qorachashoʻrkent, Koʻkyor, Navkent, Nanay, Poromon, Rovot, Sangiston, Salmon, Xoʻjashoʻrkent, Yumaloqtepa) and 11 rural communities.

References 

Districts of Uzbekistan
Namangan Region